Yevgeniya Kuznetsova is the name of

 Yevgeniya Kuznetsova (athlete) (born 1936), Soviet discus thrower
 Evgeniya Kuznetsova (born 1980), Bulgarian gymnast of Russian descent